Waaris is a 1988 Indian Hindi-language film directed by Raveendra Peepat. It stars Smita Patil, Raj Babbar, Amrita Singh, Raj Kiran in lead roles. The film was adapted from the Punjabi novel Kaara — Hatthi by Sohan Singh Hans (as credited in the film). Audience had a mainstream story with some Masala quality entertainment. Hindi film actress Rekha dubbed the lines for late actress Smita Patil who died before the film's release. Patil won the Best Actress trophy at the 2nd Star & Style-Lux Awards.

Plot
Multi-millionaire widower Kishan Singh prepares a will which states that his ancestral property is equally divided among his two sons, Gajjan and Dulla, while the son of Gajjan, Shravan shall inherit the farm land. Enraged at not willing anything to his three sons, Thade, Dara and Chhote, Dulla confronts his father which leads to an argument leading to violence and Kishan is killed in the process. Dulla is then apprehended by the police and is jailed, leaving his sons to be raised by Gajjan. Years later Shravan meets with a poor young woman, Paramjit alias Paro and both fall in love leading to marriage. Eventually, Dulla's sentence gets completed and he joins the family once again; shortly after he schemes with goons to have Shravan killed. With no one to claim their rights on Shravan's land, this leaves the way clear for Dulla and his three sons to take control of this land, but Paro will not permit this to happen and the only way she can prevent this is by giving birth to an heir, so she confronts Gajjan to remarry her younger sister, Shibo but there is a short-coming involved as Shibo is in love with a young man, Bhinder and wants to marry only him.

Cast

Smita Patil as Paramjeet "Paro"
Raj Babbar as Binder
Amrita Singh as Sibo
Raj Kiran as Sharvan Singh
Kulbhushan Kharbanda as Gajjan Singh
Amrish Puri as Dulla Singh
Pradeep Kumar as Kishan Singh
Sushma Seth as Paro's Mother
Navneet Nishan as Channo
Javed Khan as Chhote
Avtar Gill as Dara
Sudhir Pandey as Thanna Singh "Thade"
Ramesh Tiwari as Thekedar
Amrit Pal as Sarpanch Gursharan Singh
Anjana Mumtaz as Sibo's Real Mother
Deep Dhillon as Police Inspector
Sardar Sohi as Constable Hridaymal Murarilal
Rekha as Dubbing for Smita Patil

Soundtrack
Music by Uttam Singh and Jagdish Sodhi and lyrics by Verma Malik.

References

External links
 

1988 films
1980s Hindi-language films
Indian drama films
Films based on Indian novels
1988 drama films
Hindi-language drama films